Sumino can refer to:

Places
 Sumino, a village in the Babushkinsky District of Vologda Oblast, Russia
 Sumino, a village in the Cherepovetsky District of Vologda Oblast, Russia

People
Hayato Sumino, Japanese pianist
Naoko Yamazaki, born Naoko Sumino, Japanese astronaut
Yoru Sumino, Japanese novelist

Japanese-language surnames
Geography of Vologda Oblast